The 8th Guldbagge Awards ceremony, presented by the Swedish Film Institute, honored the best Swedish films of 1971 and 1972, and took place on 23 October 1972. The Apple War directed by Tage Danielsson was presented with the award for Best Film.

Awards
 Best Film: The Apple War by Tage Danielsson
 Best Director: Tage Danielsson for The Apple War
 Best Actor: Eddie Axberg for The Emigrants and The New Land
 Best Actress: Monica Zetterlund for The Apple War and The New Land
 Special Achievement: Bengt Forslund

References

External links
Official website
Guldbaggen on Facebook
Guldbaggen on Twitter
8th Guldbagge Awards at Internet Movie Database

1972 in Sweden
1972 film awards
Guldbagge Awards ceremonies
October 1972 events in Europe
1970s in Stockholm